Chico Banks (March 7, 1962 – December 3, 2008) was an American Chicago blues guitarist and singer. He released one album, in 1997 on Evidence Music, produced by Grammy nominee Larry Hoffman. Banks was both a band-leader and premiere sideman, sought-after as a sideman in Chicago, having played with many of that city's best blues musicians from his late teens until his death at the age of 46. He is best known for his tracks "Your Fine" and "Candy Lickin' Man". He was the son of the guitarist Jessie Banks, who played backing for the Mighty Clouds of Joy.

One commentator noted that Banks "focuses on good-time, upbeat blues". He was an influence on the guitarist and singer Reggie Sears.

Biography
He was born Vernon X. Banks in Chicago, Illinois.

Banks was inspired by Magic Sam, Buddy Guy, Albert King, Jimi Hendrix, Otis Clay, George Benson and Tyrone Davis. His blues guitar playing incorporated jazz and funk stylings. He first played in a covers group in his mid-teens. He later worked with Guy and Clay and with Melvin Taylor, James Cotton, Little Milton, Magic Slim, and Big Time Sarah. He contributed to the album Long Way to Ol' Miss, by Willie Kent, recorded in 1996, as well as to the album Back in Chicago  by Freddie Roulette featured with Willie Kent and the Gents. It was in the studio during the Freddie Roulette session that Willie Kent suggested that Hoffman, the producer of that project, and Chico, work together. 

His debut album, Candy Lickin' Man, including vocals by Mavis Staples, was produced by Larry Hoffman, and released by Evidence Records in 1997. Banks played on Lee "Shot" Williams's album Let the Good Times Roll in 2002 and on Tyrone Davis's album Come to Daddy in 2003.

In 2007, Banks underwent surgery for a faulty heart valve. He died in Chicago in December 2008.

See also
List of Chicago blues musicians
List of electric blues musicians

References

1962 births
2008 deaths
American blues guitarists
American male guitarists
Chicago blues musicians
American session musicians
20th-century American guitarists
Guitarists from Chicago
20th-century American male musicians
21st-century American guitarists
21st-century American male musicians